Keith-Lee Castle (born 14 September 1968) is a British actor.

Career
Throughout his career, he has guest-starred in numerous television shows, mostly British.   He has also appeared in several films, including playing 'the psychotic Psychs', the owner of the doll, in Seed of Chucky (2004), and Clarence Weasel in The Wind in the Willows (1996), based on the popular book.  To portray the rather loony weasel he wore small furry ears, a long tail and a long, yellow swishing coat.  He also had a small part in Velvet Goldmine (1998) and in EastEnders (1999) as Dean Collins. In 2000, Castle starred in a horror, documentary-style show called Urban Gothic, in which he played Rex, a vampire who lives and hunts on the night streets of Soho.

To his younger viewers, he is probably best known for his role in the CBBC series Young Dracula , which debuted 2006 and ended in 2014, as the infamous and evil Count Dracula, father to Vlad and Ingrid Dracula, he starred alongside Gerran Howell and Clare Thomas in which his character appeared in every episode.

Castle's other roles include Patrick in the film Doghouse in 2009; the character of Patrick was formerly a high powered businessman but now more interested in playing golf and meditating, despite his wives dislike to the idea. He also played Baron, a money making football hooligan in the 2014 film The Hooligan Factory. In 2015, Castle also starred in a short film called The Stranger Kind alongside Eleanor Tomlinson, where he played Number Six; a dark, disguised magician. It then went onto be nominated for an award at the New York Horror Film Festival in 2015.

Filmography

Film

Television

References

External links
Keith-Lee Castle Spotlight 
Keith-Lee Castle Agency Profile

1968 births
Living people
20th-century English male actors
21st-century English male actors
English male film actors
English male television actors